Laura Gibilisco (born 17 January 1986 in Syracuse) is an Italian hammer thrower.

Biography
Her personal best throw is 66.90 metres, achieved in April 2008 in Syracuse.
 She is not related to the Italian pole vaulter Giuseppe Gibilisco.

Achievements

References

External links
 

1986 births
Athletics competitors of Fiamme Azzurre
Italian female hammer throwers
Living people
People from Syracuse, Sicily
Sportspeople from the Province of Syracuse
21st-century Italian women